Blinded is a film written and directed by Eleanor Yule.

The film was produced by Oscar van Heek and  John Crissey III (associate producer). Executive producers are Bill Gore, Steve McIntyre, Carole Sheridan and Agnes Wilkie. To help maintain a high level of authenticity Jill Daley worked as a blind adviser on the film.

Cast
Anders W. Berthelsen as Mike Hammershoi
Samantha Bond as Caroline Lamar
Phyllida Law as Bella Black
Jodhi May as Rachel Black
Peter Mullan as Francis Black

Awards
In 2004, the film won the Jury Award at the Celtic Film and Television Festival and it also won the Silver Screen award at the U.S. International Film and Video Festival. It was nominated for the Raindance Award at the 2004 British Independent Film Awards.

References

External links
IMDB.com: Blinded (2004/I)
Guardian.co.uk: Review
BBC Movies: Review
Eyes for Film: Review
Film Exposed: Review
Neil Young's Film Lounge: Review
Shadows on the Wall: Review
 Total Film: Review

2004 films
2004 drama films
British drama films
2000s English-language films
2000s British films